C. K. McClatchy High School, also known as simply McClatchy High School, is a high school in the Sacramento City Unified School District. It is located in the Land Park area of Sacramento, California. Established in 1937, it is the oldest operating high school in the district having succeeded crosstown rival, Sacramento High School, following its closure in 2003.  McClatchy High School boasts over fifty clubs and over 50,000 alumni.

History
Population growth in the city of Sacramento during the 1930s prompted the construction of C.K. McClatchy Senior High School, the city's second high school. Construction financing came from local sources as well as the Works Progress Administration (WPA), a New Deal economic stimulus program instituted by President Franklin Roosevelt.

The school's design was done by local architectural firm of Starks and Flanders, whose existing portfolio included downtown landmarks such as the Elks Temple, the U.S. Post Office, and the Courthouse.
On May 20, 1937, local dignitaries and students from the city's junior high schools gathered to watch the laying of the school's cornerstone bearing the name of C.K. McClatchy, the late editor and owner of The Sacramento Bee.

On September 19, 1937, the school was officially dedicated. A nurse's suite with bathrooms and a sun porch and a quartered garden with central fountain in the Moorish style were also features of the new campus.

The school has served students in the Sacramento area for over 70 years. Many local, state, national, and international figures have graduated from McClatchy. Current enrollment is around 2,400 students.

In 2002, the school was officially listed on the National Register of Historic Places.

McClatchy's newspaper, The Prospector, has been serving students for 75 years.

Statistics

Demographics
2016-17

Standardized Testing

Academics
In 2005, C.K. McClatchy High School began to be recognized as a California Distinguished School. Since then, McClatchy continues to be unique among California high schools by “beating the trends.” CKM's school-wide measure of achievement—the Academic Performance Index (API)—jumped 32 points to 745 in 2008, an additional 11 points in 2009 to 756, and the trend is expected to continue.

AFJROTC Unit CA-841
The Air Force Junior Reserve Officer Training Corps works with students who desire to develop leadership potential. The open-enrollment program provides a scholastic program in the areas of aerodynamics, science, history and cultural awareness.

Criminal Justice Academy
The Criminal Justice Academy is offered through a partnership with the Sacramento Police Department. Students study the basic course materials used by those in training to be police cadets. Additionally, the curriculum covers investigative procedures, forensic science, physical training and principles of the law.

Humanities and International Studies Program 
The Humanities and International Studies Program (abbreviated as HISP) was founded in 1985. It is an honors program designed to focus on literature and cultural studies.

Law & Public Policy Academy
The Law & Public Policy Academy's mission is to immerse students in cross-curricular law and public policy based projects and activities. Students study the history of the American legal system as well as criminal prosecution methodologies.

Visual and Performing Arts Program
The Visual and Performing Arts Program (abbreviated as VAPA) is an arts program designed for students to explore careers in the fields of art, entertainment, and media. It was founded in 2016.

Notable alumni

Politics and Judiciary
 Jeff Adachi - Former Public Defender of San Francisco (2003-2019)
 Xavier Becerra - Former member of the United States House of Representatives (1993 to 2017), 33rd Attorney General of California (2017-2021), current United States Secretary of Health and Human Services (2021-present)
 Tani Cantil-Sakauye - Chief Justice of California (2011-present)
 Anthony Kennedy - Associate Justice of the Supreme Court of the United States (1988 – 2018)
 Robert Matsui - Former member of the United States House of Representatives (1979 – 2005)
 Deborah Ortiz - Former member, California State Senate, State Assembly, Sacramento City Council (1993 – 2006)

Athletics
 Brian Bedford - former NFL and CFL wide receiver
 Larry Bowa - MLB Network analyst and former MLB shortstop and coach
 Steve Brown - Defensive coordinator of the Kentucky Wildcats and former NFL defensive back
 Kevin Clark - former NFL defensive back
 Gene Cronin - former NFL defensive end
 Malcolm Floyd - former NFL wide receiver and former C. K. McClatchy High School football coach
 Steve Holm - catcher for the Minnesota Twins
 Dion James - 11-year MLB outfielder
 Nick Johnson - first baseman for the Cleveland Indians
 Hannah Keane - 7-year(still playing) Professional Soccer Player in Germany, Portugal, Spain and Australia 
 Rowland Office - 11-year MLB outfielder
 Vance Worley - Pitcher for the Philadelphia Phillies

Arts/Entertainment
 June Millington - lead guitarist of the band Fanny
 Mel Ramos- visual artist
 Joan Didion - writer
 Chino Moreno - lead vocalist of Deftones, as well as the bands Team Sleep, Palms and Crosses.
 Stephen Carpenter - lead guitarist of Deftones and Kush.
 Abe Cunningham - drummer of the Deftones and Phallucy.
 Roger Voudouris - singer and record producer
 Channing Pollock - magician and film actor

Education
 Michael Drake - physician and president of the University of California system

The Sciences
 Curt Michel - NASA astronaut

References

External links

 C.K. McClatchy High School
 C.K. McClatchy High School Marching Lions Band

Educational institutions established in 1937
School buildings on the National Register of Historic Places in California
High schools in Sacramento, California
Public high schools in California
National Register of Historic Places in Sacramento, California
1937 establishments in California